Monika Ertl (1937-1973) was a German-Bolivian communist militant, guerrilla fighter and the daughter of Nazi propagandist Hans Ertl. She is most known for assassinating Colonel Roberto Quintanilla Pereira, the man responsible for chopping off Che Guevara's hands. This successful assassination earned her the title 'Che Guevara's avenger' in Germany. She continued to serve as a soldier in the National Liberation Army (ELN) resisting the Bolivian government  until she was captured, tortured and executed in 1973.

Biography
Ertl was born in Munich. After World War II her father immigrated to Bolivia, where he continued to film for some time and became a farmer.

Monika Ertl went to Bolivia in 1952 when her father took the family over from Germany. Her father established a new life in the farm "La Dolorida" where he was breeding livestock. In Bolivia, she accompanied her father on several filming expeditions and learnt to use both a film camera and firearms. Later, she entered a marriage briefly, but felt unhappy playing the "trophy wife" of a Bolivian-German mining engineer. After her divorce in 1969, she became involved with the survivors of Che Guevara's routed guerrilla movement, the National Liberation Army of Bolivia (ELN). After helping out in minor occasions she finally joined the political underground. She began a relationship with the ELN leader , the successor of Che Guevara. Peredo was killed by the secret service of Bolivia on 9 September 1969. In Germany, she became known as "Che Guevara's avenger" because of her involvement in the 1971 murder of Colonel Roberto Quintanilla Pereira in Hamburg, Germany: although this has never been completely proven it can safely be assumed that she did shoot Quintanilla who, at the time, was serving in Hamburg as the Bolivian consul. A message found at the murder scene had written the words Victory or Death a slogan by the ELN. A former leader of the 'National Liberation Army' (ELN) of Bolivia, Osvaldo "Chato" Peredo, confirmed, in an interview filmed by German director Christian Baudissin in 1988, that Quintanilla was a prime target of the ELN, because he had been responsible for ordering the hands of Guevara's corpse be cut off and sent to La Paz for further identification. He also states that Ertl "after carrying out the mission in Hamburg" returned to Cuba where she met with Régis Debray.

After being under covert observation in Bolivia for several days she and another guerrilla were eventually ambushed and killed by Bolivian security forces on 12 May 1973 in El Alto (in La Paz), where she was reorganizing the ELN. According to Régis Debray she was also preparing the abduction of the former Gestapo Chief of Lyon Klaus Barbie to bring him to Chile and consequently to justice in France where he was wanted as a Nazi war criminal. At the time Barbie was known to be an adviser of the secret police in Bolivia. Her body was not turned over to her family to be buried and she rests in an unknown grave.

Popular culture
 Ertl is among the prominent characters in a fictionalized account of her family, Los Afectos  (Affections) by Bolivian author Rodrigo Hasbún.

 A documentary film was made about her life, called Wanted: Monika Ertl.

 Régis Debray's book La neige brûle (fr) is dedicated to Ertl.

References

Further reading
Christian Baudissin: Wanted: Monika Ertl, documentary 1989
Jürgen Schreiber (journalist): Sie starb wie Che Guevara. Die Geschichte der Monika Ertl. Artemis & Winkler, Düsseldorf 2009

External links

Jungle World
Documentary about Monika Ertl 

1937 births
1973 deaths
People from Munich
German emigrants to Bolivia
Che Guevara
German communists